Turki (Arabic: تركي) is a Tunisian village dependent on the Nabeul Governorate, and the delegation of Grombalia.

In 2004, it had a population of 3,661 inhabitants.

An exit from the A1 motorway is in the immediate vicinity.

It is located around forty kilometers south-east of Tunis and around twenty kilometers north-west of Nabeul. Grombalia, the chief town of the municipality and the delegation, is about two kilometers northwest of the city.

Turki lies on a plain named after its neighbor Grombalia, at the western end of the Cape Bon peninsula.

History 
The village is discovered when  Moriscos were expelled from Spain in the 17th century.

See also 

 Nabeul

References 

Nabeul Governorate
Communes of Tunisia